Tanystylum is a genus of pycnogonids in the family Ammotheidae.

Species 
The following species are classified in this genus:

 Tanystylum acuminatum Stock, 1954
 Tanystylum antipodum Clark, 1977
 Tanystylum beuroisi Arnaud, 1974
 Tanystylum bigibbosum Fage & Stock, 1966
 Tanystylum birkelandi Child, 1979
 Tanystylum bredini Child, 1970
 Tanystylum brevicaudatum Fage & Stock, 1966
 Tanystylum brevipes (Hoek, 1881)
 Tanystylum calicirostrum Schimkewitsch, 1890
 Tanystylum californicum Hilton, 1939
 Tanystylum cavidorsum Stock, 1957
 Tanystylum chierchiai Schimkewitsch, 1887
 Tanystylum cinctum Child, 1992
 Tanystylum conirostre (Dohrn, 1881)
 Tanystylum distinctum Child & Hedgpeth, 1971
 Tanystylum dohrnii Schimkewitsch, 1890
 Tanystylum dowi Child, 1979
 Tanystylum duospinum Hilton, 1939
 Tanystylum evelinae Marcus, 1940
 Tanystylum excuratum Stock, 1954
 Tanystylum geminum Stock, 1954
 Tanystylum grossifemorum (Hilton, 1942)
 Tanystylum haswelli Child, 1990
 Tanystylum hoekianum Schimkewitsch, 1889
 Tanystylum hooperi Clark, 1977
 Tanystylum hummelincki Stock, 1954
 Tanystylum intermedium Cole, 1904
 Tanystylum isabellae Marcus, 1940
 Tanystylum isthmiacum Stock, 1955
 Tanystylum malpelensis Child, 1979
 Tanystylum neorhetum Marcus, 1940
 Tanystylum nesiotes Child, 1970
 Tanystylum occidentalis Cole, 1904
 Tanystylum oedinotum Loman, 1923
 Tanystylum orbiculare Wilson, 1878
 Tanystylum ornatum Flynn, 1928
 Tanystylum papuensis Child, 1996
 Tanystylum paramexicanum Müller & Krapp, 2009
 Tanystylum pfefferi Loman, 1923
 Tanystylum philippinensis Child, 1988
 Tanystylum rehderi Child, 1970
 Tanystylum scrutator Stock, 1954
 Tanystylum sinoabductus Bamber, 1992
 Tanystylum styligerum (Miers, 1875)
 Tanystylum tayronae Müller & Krapp, 2009
 Tanystylum thermophilum Barnard, 1946
 Tanystylum ulreungum Kim, 1983
 Tanystylum zuytdorpi Arango, 2009

References

Pycnogonids
Chelicerate genera